The Pleurobranchaeidae are a taxonomic family of sea slugs, marine gastropod molluscs in the clade Pleurobranchomorpha.

Genera
 Euselenops Pilsbry, 1896
 Pleurobranchaea Leue, 1813
 Pleurobranchella Thiele, 1925
Genera brought into synonymy
 Gigantonotum Lin & Tchang, 1965: synonym of Pleurobranchella Thiele, 1925
 Koonsia Verrill, 1882: synonym of Pleurobranchaea Leue, 1813
 Macfarlandaea Ev. Marcus & Gosliner, 1984: synonym of Pleurobranchaea Leue, 1813
 Neda H. Adams & A. Adams, 1854: synonym of Euselenops Pilsbry, 1896
 Oscaniopsis Bergh, 1897: synonym of Euselenops Pilsbry, 1896
 Pleurobranchidium Leue, 1813: synonym of Pleurobranchaea Leue, 1813
 Pleurobranchillus Bergh, 1892: synonym of Pleurobranchaea Leue, 1813
 Pleurobranchoides O'Donoghue, 1929: synonym of Pleurobranchella Thiele, 1925

References

 Bouchet P. & Rocroi J.-P. (2005). Classification and nomenclator of gastropod families. Malacologia. 47(1-2): 1-397